is a Japanese high jumper. He is the bronze medallist in the high jump at the 2003 World Youth Championships and the champion at the 2009 East Asian Games.

Personal best

International competition

National title
Japanese Championships
High jump: 2008

References

External links

Hikaru Tsuchiya at Monteroza Athletics Club  (archived)

1986 births
Living people
Sportspeople from Osaka Prefecture
Japanese male high jumpers
Asian Games competitors for Japan
Athletes (track and field) at the 2006 Asian Games
Japan Championships in Athletics winners